C.R. Alsip Guitars, is a small American guitar manufacturing company founded in Arkansas City, KS on Feb. 2012. The company operated in Kansas from 2012 to 2014. The company is now based in the Atlanta, GA area. C.R. Alsip LLC was named after Connie Rae Alsip-Willoughby. C.R. Alsip LLC is owned & operated by Connie's son Jake Willoughby who originally planned to name the company "Mason Alsip".

History 

Jake's grandpa  (Max Ray Alsip) worked as a stonemason until his retirement. Before the company was off the ground Connie passed on & Jake decided to name the company after his late mother to honor her & help spread the word about cancer awareness. Jake & C.R. Alsip Guitars worked hand in hand with Phil Collen (Def Leppard) in 2012 to raise funds for the Gerson Institute. 

The company has built instruments for, and worked with, acts such as Def Leppard, Tesla, Firehouse, Love & Theft & Saving Abel. Bill Leverty of Firehouse & Frank Hannon of Tesla were the first guitarists to endorse C.R. Alsip guitars and play them on the road when the company opened its doors in 2012. 

Some of the current artists endorsing C.R. Alsip guitars includes Bill Leverty (Firehouse), Allen McKenzie (Firehouse), Frank Hannon (Tesla), Jeff Caughron (Jesta James, Full Devil Jacket), Scott Bartlett (Saving Abel) & many others.

References

External links 

 

Manufacturing companies based in Texas
Howard County, Texas
Guitar manufacturing companies of the United States